In horse racing, the form of a horse is a record of significant events, mainly its performance in previous races. The form may identify the horse's sire, dam and wider pedigree. It is used by tipsters and punters as an aid in the prediction of its performance in future races.

A typical way of showing a horse's form, as published in newspapers and other media, is shown here.

 Number   Colours   Form     Horse Name      Age  Weight  Trainer   Jockey  
   3      image     43-2F1   Mill Reef        3   11-12   A.Smith   L.Piggott
   7      image     680U54   Glue Pot         3   11-10   B.Brown   F.Dettori

Abbreviations used to decode the Form column can include:

Form is arranged chronologically from left (oldest) to right (newest).

So, in the example above, the horse Mill Reef gained a fourth place, followed by a third, then took some time out from racing, then gained a second followed by falling in the next race, and its latest result was a win.

See also
Racecard

References

Horse racing terminology